Guns Akimbo is a 2019 action comedy film written and directed by Jason Lei Howden. It stars Daniel Radcliffe, Samara Weaving, Ned Dennehy, Natasha Liu Bordizzo, Grant Bowler, Edwin Wright, Rhys Darby, Milo Cawthorne, Richard Knowles, and Mark Rowley.

The film had its world premiere at the 2019 Toronto International Film Festival and was released in New Zealand on 5 March 2020 by Madman Entertainment. Due to the COVID-19 pandemic closing theatres worldwide, the film became available digitally on-demand less than three weeks after it was released theatrically.

Plot
In an alternative near future, an underground fight club and a criminal organization known as Skizm has achieved massive popularity by live-streaming real death matches between criminals and psychos. Ordinary computer programmer Miles Lee Harris, who gets his kicks by trolling online trolls, logs into Skizm’s forum to insult viewers who turn murder into entertainment. Riktor, the criminal kingpin and psychopath who runs Skizm, breaks into Miles’ apartment with his henchmen Dane, Effie, and Fuckface. After being beaten and drugged, Miles wakes up to find guns bloodily bolted into both of his hands. Miles learns that he has been forced to participate in Skizm by being pitted against Nix, the game’s deadliest and craziest killer; she wants out but Riktor requires she kill one last opponentMiles.

Nix tracks Miles’ phone. He tries to reason with Nix, but she intends to kill him. Miles distracts her and she shoots up his apartment as he falls down the fire escape. After unsuccessfully attempting to recruit help from the police, Miles makes it to the park to meet his artist ex-girlfriend Nova Alexander, who tells Miles that she doesn’t want to get back together. When Miles reveals what is happening to him, Nova flees in fright. Nova reports the situation to Detective Degraves. Degraves has his partner Stanton hack Nova’s phone so they can track Miles. Miles gets temporary help from a vagrant named Glenjamin. Miles then goes to the office where he works so his friend Hadley can hack the Skizm tracking malware on his phone.

Miles finally gets assertive by angrily pulling his guns after his continually condescending boss Zander insults him. Zander is shot in the head by Nix, who appears and starts shooting up the office. Miles escapes in a stolen car and Nix chases him on a motorbike. Following a face-off where he again fails to reason with Nix, Miles calls Nova but sees Riktor kidnapping her. Miles phones the police and leaves his mobile in a junkyard to provide the location. He then inadvertently interrupts a drug deal between two rival gangs. Nix shows up and starts gunning down thugs while trying to get to Miles. Miles ended up accidentally making his first kill, a gang lord who hunted him down.

The police arrive and arrest Miles. While transporting him, Degraves and Stanton explain their plan to use Miles as bait to lure Nix, who they have been trying to capture for years. Degraves reveals that Nix is his daughter. Nix was driven criminally insane after Riktor took revenge on Degraves for taking down Riktor’s gang by blowing up his family’s van. Degraves had managed to save Nix, but his wife and son had died. Stanton reveals that he is a mole working for Riktor when he shoots Degraves in the head.

Stanton plays a video message in which Riktor explains that Miles has thirty minutes to kill Nix or else he will kill Nova. Miles recovers his phone from Degraves’ body. While coercing a gaming café patron into hacking Nova’s phone to retrieve her location, Miles learns the Skizm communities dubbed him ‘Guns Akimbo’ as he has become the most popular player ever. Miles arrives at Nova’s supposed location to find Riktor waiting. Riktor taunts Miles by dumping Hadley’s dead body before driving away.

Miles manages to secretly meet with Nix and tells her that Riktor murdered her father and kidnapped his ex-girlfriend. In her rage and desire for revenge, Nix agrees to a plan where they successfully stage a scene for Skizm's broadcast camera drones. She seemingly guns down Miles, who is actually wearing a bulletproof vest that he removed from Degraves. Henchmen recover Miles' body and transport him to Riktor's Skizm hideout. Nix joins Miles as they take down Riktor's henchmen, including Dane and Effie. Nix sacrifices herself by detonating a suicide vest that blows up Fuckface and the rest of Riktor's men so Miles can survive. Riktor executes Stanton while making his way to the rooftop with Nova.

At the rooftop, Riktor keeps shooting Miles, but the latter determinedly charges at Riktor and ultimately throws him off the roof to his death, not before Riktor tells Miles that Skizm has spread worldwide and is becoming a global franchise. After Riktor dies, Miles starts to collapse from massive blood loss while imagining a romantic reunion with Nova. However, Nova actually becomes frightened and goes into shock after seeing what Miles is turning into.

Some time later, Miles is scarred from his injuries, and while sitting in his car, he opens a file. He discovers a comic book written by Nova and learns that she is promoting Miles as a popular hero by writing a comic book based on their story. With Skizm spreading worldwide under new leaderships, Miles commits himself to do everything in his power to destroy the entire criminal organization.

Cast
 Daniel Radcliffe as Miles Lee Harris
 Samara Weaving as Nix Degraves
 Ned Dennehy as Riktor
 Natasha Liu Bordizzo as Nova Alexander
 Grant Bowler as Detective Degraves
 Edwin Wright as Stanton
 Rhys Darby as Glenjamin
 Milo Cawthorne as Hadley
 Richard Knowles as Zander
 Mark Rowley as Dane
 Racheal Ofori as Effie
 Colin Moy as Clive
 Hanako Footman as Ruby
 Set Sjöstrand as Fuckface
 J. David Hinze as CNN Anchor 
 Jack Riddiford as Shadwell

Production

On 12 May 2017, it was announced that Daniel Radcliffe would be starring in Guns Akimbo by New Zealand director Jason Lei Howden, whose previous projects include the film Deathgasm. Felipe Marino and Joe Neurauter were also announced to be producing the film through Occupant Entertainment. On 8 May 2018, Natasha Liu Bordizzo was added to the cast, starring opposite Radcliffe. Filming was completed on-location and in-studio in Auckland and Munich.

Music
The soundtrack features original music composed by Enis Rotthoff.

Songs used in the film: 
 "3 Words" by AKA Block
 "Ballroom Blitz" by 3Teeth
 "You Spin Me Round (Like a Record)" by 3Teeth
 "When the Shit Goes Down" by Cypress Hill
 "We'll Be Good Friends" by Cellamare
 "Real Wild Child" by Iggy Pop
 "Superfreak" by Rick James
 "Never Surrender" by Stan Bush

Release
The film had its world premiere at the Toronto International Film Festival on 9 September 2019. It also screened at Fantastic Fest on 19 September 2019. Shortly afterwards, Saban Films acquired US distribution rights to the film. It was released in Australia and the United States on 28 February 2020.  The film was released in New Zealand on 5 March 2020.

The film was released onto home video by Madman on DVD, Blu-ray and Digital on 27 May in Australia, followed by an 11 June release in New Zealand.

Controversy
A week prior to the film’s release, director Jason Lei Howden drew criticism for a series of tweets targeted at online film critics, accusing them of online bullying and "attempted murder" of another critic.

Despite speculation that the film's release would be delayed, distributor Saban later released a statement confirming that the film would be released as planned, adding, "While we do not condone, agree or share Mr. Howden's online behaviour, which is upsetting and disturbing, we are supportive of the film and all the hard work and dedication that has gone into making Guns Akimbo."

Reception
The site's critical consensus reads, "Frenetic to a fault, Guns Akimbo may leave some viewers reaching for the killswitch – but for others, its videogame-style violence will have plenty of replay value." On Metacritic, the film has a weighted average score of 42 out of 100 based on 9 critic reviews, indicating "mixed or average reviews".

John DeFore of The Hollywood Reporter wrote: "The ingredients for an engagingly ridiculous action pic are here, but the pacing's all wrong."
Dennis Harvey of Variety wrote: "This undeniably slick, energetic contraption plays somewhere between grating and numbing."

References

External links
 
 

2019 action comedy films
2019 films
British action comedy films
British gangster films
English-language German films
Films about death games
Films about organized crime
Films shot in Munich
Films shot in New Zealand
German action comedy films
New Zealand action comedy films
2010s English-language films
2010s British films
2010s German films